"When You Say Nothing at All" is a country song written by Paul Overstreet and Don Schlitz. It was a hit song for four different performers: Keith Whitley, who took it to the top of the Billboard Hot Country Singles chart on December 24, 1988; Alison Krauss, whose version was her first solo top-10 country hit in 1995; Irish singer Frances Black, whose 1996 version became her third Irish top-10 single and brought the song to the attention of Irish pop singer Ronan Keating, whose 1999 version was his first solo single and a number-one hit in the United Kingdom, Ireland, and New Zealand.

Origin
Overstreet and Schlitz came up with "When You Say Nothing at All" at the end of an otherwise unproductive day. Strumming a guitar, trying to write their next song, they were coming up empty. "As we tried to find another way to say nothing, we came up with the song", Overstreet later told author Ace Collins. They thought the song was OK, but nothing special. When Keith Whitley heard it, he loved it, and was not going to let it get away. Earlier, he had recorded another Overstreet-Schlitz composition that became a No. 1 hit for another artist - Randy Travis' "On the Other Hand." Whitley did not plan to let "When You Say Nothing at All" meet the same fate.

Keith Whitley
RCA released "When You Say Nothing at All" as the follow-up single to the title song of Whitley's Don't Close Your Eyes album. The former song already had hit No. 1 on the Billboard Hot Country Singles chart, his first chart-topper after three prior singles made the top 10. "When You Say Nothing at All" entered the Hot Country Singles chart on September 17, 1988, at No. 61, and gradually rose to the top, where it stayed for two weeks at the end of the year. It was the second of five consecutive chart-topping singles for Whitley, who did not live to see the last two, as he died on May 9, 1989, of alcohol poisoning. "Keith did a great job singin' that song," co-composer Schlitz told author Tom Roland. "He truly sang it from the heart." In 2004, Whitley's original was ranked 12th among CMT's 100 Greatest Love Songs. It was sung by Sara Evans on the show.  As of February 2015, the song has sold 599,000 digital copies in the US after it became available for download.

Charts

Weekly charts

Year-end charts

Alison Krauss version

In 1995, Alison Krauss covered the song with the group Union Station for a tribute album to Whitley titled Keith Whitley: A Tribute Album. After Krauss's cover began to receive unsolicited airplay, BNA Records, the label that had released the album, issued Krauss' version to radio in January 1995. That version, also featured on Krauss' compilation Now That I've Found You: A Collection, peaked at No. 3 on the Billboard Hot Country Singles & Tracks chart, and a commercial single reached No. 2 on the same magazine's Hot Country Singles Sales chart.  The B-side of the single was Keith Whitley's "Charlotte's in North Carolina", which was another previously unreleased track featured on the Tribute album.

Its success, as well as that of the album, caught Krauss by surprise. "It's a freak thing," she told a Los Angeles Times reporter in March 1995. "It's kinda ticklin' us all. We haven't had anything really chart before. At all. Isn't it funny though? We don't know what's goin' on....The office said, 'Hey, it's charting,' and we're like, 'Huh?'"

While Krauss' version was on the charts, Mike Cromwell, then the production director at WMIL-FM in Milwaukee, Wisconsin, concocted a duet merging elements of Krauss' version with Whitley's original hit version. The "duet" garnered national attention, and it spread from at least Philadelphia to Albuquerque, and has been heard on radio stations in California as well.  This "duet" was however never officially serviced to radio and has never been available commercially.

Krauss' recording won the 1995 CMA award for "Single of the Year". The song has been featured a couple of times in the soap opera The Young and the Restless. Krauss' version was also used in the 1999 motion picture The Other Sister. The song has sold 468,000 digital downloads as of May 2017.

Track listing
 "When You Say Nothing at All"
 "Charlotte's In North Carolina"

Charts

Weekly charts

Year-end charts

Certifications

Frances Black version

"When You Say Nothing At All" was the opening track on, and first single released from, Frances Black's third solo album, 1996's "The Smile On Your Face", the title of the album being a lyric from this song. Released in August 1996, this single became her third to reach the Irish Top 10, peaking at number 8 during an 11-week run in the top 30.

Track listing
 "When You Say Nothing at All"
 "Send Him A Letter"

Credits and personnel

Personnel

 Paul Overstreet – writing
 Don Schilitz – writing
 Frances Black – vocals
 Mary Black – backing vocals
 Arty McGlynn – guitar, production

 Ciarán Byrnes – engineering, production
 Rod McVey – keyboards, piano
 Noel Bridgeman – drums
 James Blennerhasset - bass

Charts

Ronan Keating version

"When You Say Nothing at All" was released as the debut solo single by Irish singer-songwriter Ronan Keating. The song was recorded for the soundtrack to the film Notting Hill and also appeared on Keating's debut solo album, Ronan. This cover was released on July 26, 1999, in the United Kingdom. It peaked at number one in the UK, Ireland, and New Zealand. The single is certified double platinum in the UK and platinum in Australia, Denmark, and Sweden.

In February 2003, Keating re-recorded the song as a duet with Mexican singer Paulina Rubio in Spanglish, which was released in Spain, Mexico, and Latin America (excluding Brazil) to promote Keating's second studio album, Destination. In Brazil, Ronan chose the Brazilian singer Deborah Blando to re-record the song in English and English-Portuguese for the 10 Years Of Hits album exclusive for that country. A music video was recorded for this version with Blando.

Critical reception
Daily Record wrote that Keating "sounds like Marti Pellow on this drippy ballad." The popular Spanish website Jenesaispop described the Spanglish version as one of the most "squeaky" bilingual collaboration, while Victor González of GQ Spain praised the collaboration as "great" in an article of unusual collaborations.

Track listings

 UK CD1
 "When You Say Nothing at All"
 "When You Say Nothing at All" (acoustic version)
 "This Is Your Song"
 "When You Say Nothing at All" (video CD ROM)

 UK CD2
 "When You Say Nothing At All"
 "At the End of a Perfect Day"
 "I Will Miss You"

 UK cassette single
 "When You Say Nothing at All"
 "This Is Your Song"

 Australian CD single
 "When You Say Nothing at All"
 "This Is Your Song"
 "When You Say Nothing at All" (acoustic version)

Credits and personnel
Credits are taken from the UK CD1 liner notes.

Studios
 Recorded at Metropolis and the Aquarium (London, England)
 Mixed at the Aquarium (London, England)
 Mastered at 777 Productions (London, England)

Personnel

 Paul Overstreet – writing
 Don Schilitz – writing
 Ronan Keating – vocals
 Miriam Stockley – backing vocals
 Tessa Niles – backing vocals
 Dominic Miller – guitar

 Stephen Lipson – bass, production, programming
 Peter-John Vettese – keyboards
 James McNally – whistle, accordion
 Andy Duncan – drums
 Heff Moraes – engineering, mixing
 Arun Chakraverty – mastering

Charts

Weekly charts

Year-end charts

Certifications

References

1980s ballads
1988 singles
1988 songs
1990s ballads
1995 singles
1999 debut singles
Alison Krauss & Union Station songs
BNA Records singles
Country ballads
Keith Whitley songs
Irish Singles Chart number-one singles
Music videos directed by Xavier Gens
Number-one singles in New Zealand
Number-one singles in Scotland
Paulina Rubio songs
Polydor Records singles
Pop ballads
RCA Records Nashville singles
Ronan Keating songs
Song recordings produced by Garth Fundis
Song recordings produced by Stephen Lipson
Songs written by Don Schlitz
Songs written by Paul Overstreet
UK Singles Chart number-one singles